A currency transaction report (CTR) is a report that U.S. financial institutions are required to file with FinCEN for each deposit, withdrawal, exchange of currency, or other payment or transfer, by, through, or to the financial institution which involves a transaction in currency of more than $10,000. Used in this context, currency means the coin and/or paper money of any country that is designated as legal tender by the country of issuance. Currency also includes U.S. silver certificates, U.S. notes, Federal Reserve notes, and official foreign bank notes.

History 
When the first version of the CTR was introduced, the only way a suspicious transaction less than $10,000 was reported to the government was if a bank teller called law enforcement. This was primarily due to the financial industry's concern about the right to financial privacy. The Bank Secrecy Act requires financial institutions to report currency transaction amounts of over $10,000.

Procedure 
Tax and other information about the customer is usually pre-filled by the bank software. CTRs since 1996 include an optional checkbox at the top if the bank employee believes the transaction to be suspicious or fraudulent, commonly called a SAR, or Suspicious Activity Report. A customer is not directly told about the  threshold unless they initiate the inquiry. A customer may decline to continue the transaction upon being informed about the CTR, but this would require the bank employee to file a SAR. This sort of attempt is known as structuring, and is punishable by federal law against both the customer and the bank employee. Those who habitually run transactions just under the  threshold will likely subject themselves to scrutiny and/or the filing of a SAR.

References

External links 

 FinCEN Currency Transaction Report PDF

United States government forms
Bank Secrecy Act